List of the statues and memorials in Baku, the capital of Azerbaijan.

Statues

Busts

Monuments and memorials

See also 
 List of Monuments in Azerbaijan

References 

Baku

Statues
Baku